This Type of Thinking (Could Do Us In) is the third studio album by American rock band Chevelle. Debuting at No. 8 on the Billboard 200 based on nearly 90,000 copies sold in its first week, it charted higher than its predecessor, Wonder What's Next but did not exceed its debut position. The album did not manage to match its predecessor's commercial success, but was certified platinum. This Type of Thinking follows generally the same heavy style as Wonder What's Next with popular singles like "Vitamin R" and "The Clincher". It would be the first of two records produced by Michael "Elvis" Baskette. This was also the final album featuring bassist Joe Loeffler, who departed from the band in 2005.

Background and recording
Coming off a highly successful major label debut, Chevelle finishing touring on December 17, 2003. They set out to write a follow-up album from scratch at the onset of the following year in what drummer Sam Loeffler described as a different approach to writing. He also noted how the band felt significant pressure from their label to not simply match but topple the platinum success of Wonder What's Next. In a 2004 interview, Loeffler described the process of approaching This Type of Thinking:
"We went home for Christmas and after New Year's we went into the studio and we said, 'All right, we have to write a whole record in basically four months.' We had no songs, so we had to write that whole record and we ended up taking five months. We wanted to go heavy, we wanted to do a lot of double-bass drum, kind of syncopated rhythms, and we wanted to basically write songs that we could bob our heads to. That was sort of where we started. We're a heavy melodic rock band, that's what we like to write, and that's what we like to play. And that's what we did."

This time around, Chevelle opted to produce their own album with the help of Michael "Elvis" Baskette. This Type of Thinking would continue the balance of melody and heaviness of its predecessor. And much like the final track on Wonder What's Next, "Bend the Bracket" would be recorded simply as an acoustic demo for its unpolished presentation.

Critical reception

AllMusic editor Johnny Loftus observes the album as "...flatly mixed, lost in depression, and obsessed with rewriting "Sober" for a new generation of lank-haired misunderstoods."

Melodic calls it "...a real quality album that you will never get bored of.", praising the songs "The Clincher", "Vitamin R (Leading Us Along)" and "Another Know It All".

Track listing

Personnel
Chevelle
 Pete Loeffler – guitar, vocals
 Joe Loeffler – bass, backing vocals
 Sam Loeffler – drums

Technical personnel
 Andy Wallace – mixing
 Ben Goldman – A&R
 Christian Lantry – photography
 Dave Holdredge – digital editing, drum programming, engineer
 Eddy Schreyer – mastering
 Farra Mathews – A&R
 Jef Moll – assistant
 Josh Wilbur – digital editing
 Katharina Fritsch – cover sculpture
 Kevin Dean – assistant
 Michael "Elvis" Baskette – engineer, producer
 Sean Evans – art direction
 Steve Sisco – assistant

Charts

Certifications

References

2004 albums
Albums produced by Michael Baskette
Chevelle (band) albums
Epic Records albums